The Deli is a 1997 American independent comedy-drama film directed by John Gallagher and starring Mike Starr and Matt Keeslar.

Cast
 Mike Starr as Johnny
 Matt Keeslar as Andy
 Judith Malina as Mrs. Amico
 Brian Vincent as "Pinky"
 Ice-T as Phil, The Meat Man
 Michael Imperioli as Matty
 David Johansen as Cabbie
 Heather Matarazzo as Sabrina
 Debi Mazar as Teresa
 Jerry Stiller as Petey "Cheesecake"
 Frank Vincent as Tommy "Tomatoes"
 Burt Young as J.D.
 Michael Badalucco as Eric, The Soda Man
 Heavy D as Bo
 Iman as Avocado Lady
 William McNamara as Kevin
 Gretchen Mol as Mary
 Chris Noth as Sal
 Tony Sirico as Tony 
 Shirley Stoler as Irma

Reception
Michael Wilmington of the Chicago Tribune gave the film a mixed review and wrote, "This movie takes a talented and likable cast and an interesting working-class Italian-American background and then wastes them on sitcom scenes and side-of-the-mouth jokes."

Joe Leydon of Variety also gave it a mixed review and wrote that "this small-budget indie comedy is too slight to make much impact on critics or ticketbuyers."

References

External links
 
 

American independent films
American comedy-drama films
1997 independent films
1997 films
1997 comedy-drama films
1990s English-language films
1990s American films